The Chongqing Chinese Self-supporting Methodist Church is an independent Chinese Christian church founded in Chongqing by Liu Ziru (1870–1948) in 1915. They were one of the earliest indigenous churches established by local Chinese Christians.

History

Beliefs

See also 
 Methodism in Sichuan

References

External links
Chongqing Chinese Self-supporting Methodist Church 

1915 establishments in China
Christian organizations established in 1915
Chinese Independent Churches
Christianity in Chongqing
Methodism in Sichuan
History of Christianity in Sichuan